Frederick Thomas Callcott (1854 – 11 May 1923) was a British sculptor and artist.

Early life
Frederick Thomas Callcott was born in St Clement Danes, London, the son of Frederick Herbert Callcott. The architect, Charles William Callcott (born 1864) was his younger brother.

Career
Callcott designed the interior carved panels in the Black Lion, a Grade II* listed public house at 274 Kilburn High Road, Kilburn, London.

Callcott was also responsible for some of the work in The Black Friar, Blackfriars.

In 1899, Callcott was responsible for sculpting the memorial to the nine out of a crew of 13 who died in a failed rescue attempt by the boat Friend to all Nations in Margate in 1897.

Callcott died on 11 May 1923. He was living at 17 Woodstock Road, Golders Green, London, but died in St Leonards on Sea, Sussex.

Personal life
Callcott married fellow sculptor, Florence Newman (1867–1938) on 9 April 1912 in All Saints, St John's Wood, London.

References

1854 births
1923 deaths
20th-century British sculptors
19th-century British sculptors
British male sculptors
19th-century British male artists
20th-century British male artists